Ahmed Al-Minhali (born 5 May 1999) is a Qatari footballer who plays as a left back for Qatari club Al-Sailiya.

Honours

Club
Al-Sailiya SC
 Qatar FA Cup: 2021
 Qatari Stars Cup: 2020-21

References

1999 births
Living people
Qatari footballers
Association football fullbacks
Al-Sailiya SC players
Al-Duhail SC players
Qatar Stars League players
Qatar youth international footballers
Qatar under-20 international footballers